Frederick Lancaster may refer to:

 Frederick J. Lancaster, land developer in New York
 Frederick Wilfrid Lancaster (1933–2013), British-American information scientist